Espedalen is a valley in the Sør-Fron and Gausdal municipalities of Innlandet county, Norway.

Historically, mining was important in Espedalen with copper mining dating to the 1600s. Nickel mining was introduced in the 1880s. At the north end of the lake Espedalsvatnet are the remains of smelting and mining settlements from that time.

Espedalen Chapel was built in 1974 to serve the local population. The wooden building was designed by the architect Bjarne Bystad Ellefsen.

References

Valleys of Innlandet
Sør-Fron
Gausdal